Martín Abundis, (born 10 April 1996) is a Mexican footballer who plays as a forward for Deportivo Zitácuaro of the Liga Premier de México.

Club career

Toluca
Martín football career at Toluca in 2011. He has competed for the U-15, U-17 and U-20 sides and was called up to the senior team in 2014. He made his first appearance with the first team on April 19, 2014, under coach José Cardozo, in a Liga MX match against Club Atlas coming on as a substitute for Daniel González in the 84th minute. The match ended in a 1–0 loss. On May 7, 2016, Abundiz scored his first professional goal in a Liga MX match against Monterrey, scoring the game-winning header on the 69th minute after being a halftime substitute. The match ended 1–2 to Toluca at the Estadio BBVA Bancomer.

Personal life
Martín is the son of former Toluca and Mexico striker, José Manuel Abundis.

Career statistics

Club

External links

References

1996 births
Living people
Footballers from Jalisco
Association football forwards
Deportivo Toluca F.C. players
Club Celaya footballers
Potros UAEM footballers
Liga MX players
Ascenso MX players
Liga Premier de México players
Mexican footballers